Kevin Pezzoni (born 22 March 1989) is a German professional footballer who plays as a defender for German club SG Bad Soden. He was capped by various German youth national teams including the Germany U21. His normal position is defense, although he can also play in midfield.

Career
Pezzoni spent five years at the Blackburn Rovers youth academy, along with other German youth players Mahmadi Keita and Sergio Peter before signing for 1. FC Köln in January 2008.

Pezzoni played 90 games for Köln, scoring three goals, before he had his contract terminated by mutual agreement with 1. FC Köln on 1 September 2012 after incidents with hooligan supporters of the club. Pezzoni started training for a Hertha BSC after his release.

On 21 December 2012, it was revealed that Pezzoni had signed with 2. Bundesliga side FC Erzgebirge Aue. Pezzoni's contract was dissolved in January 2014 and he signed a new contract with 3. Liga side 1. FC Saarbrücken. After Saarbrücken were relegated at the end of the 2013–14 season, he left the club and signed for FC Wohlen.

In June 2019, it was announced Pezzoni would join Regionalliga Südwest side Kickers Offenbach from SC Hessen Dreieich, who were relegated from the league at the end of the 2018–19 season, for the 2019–20 season.

References

External links
 
 

1989 births
Living people
German people of Italian descent
German footballers
Association football defenders
Association football midfielders
Germany under-21 international footballers
Germany youth international footballers
Bundesliga players
2. Bundesliga players
3. Liga players
Regionalliga players
Swiss Challenge League players
1. FC Köln players
FC Erzgebirge Aue players
1. FC Saarbrücken players
FC Wohlen players
SV Wehen Wiesbaden players
Apollon Smyrnis F.C. players
SC Hessen Dreieich players
Kickers Offenbach players
FC Gießen players
German expatriate footballers
German expatriate sportspeople in England
Expatriate footballers in England
German expatriate sportspeople in Switzerland
Expatriate footballers in Switzerland
German expatriate sportspeople in Greece
Expatriate footballers in Greece
Footballers from Frankfurt